A Summer You Will Never Forget is a 1959 West German drama film directed by Werner Jacobs and starring Claus Biederstaedt, Antje Geerk and Karin Dor. It was based on a novel by Marion Jahn.

It was shot around Wörthersee in the Austrian state of Carinthia. The film's sets were designed by the art directors Franz Bi and Carl Ludwig Kirmse. It was shot using Eastmancolor.

Main cast
Claus Biederstaedt as Ernst Leuchtenthal
Antje Geerk as Marianne
Karin Dor as Christine von Auffenberg
Fita Benkhoff as Therese Leuchtenthal
Heli Finkenzeller as Mrs. Dr.Manning
Carl Wery as Fürst Aufenberger
Alexander Golling as Konsul Leuchtenthal
Eddi Arent as Ruprecht
Helga Martin as Anni
Benno Kusche as Dr. Bachmeier Tierarzt
Sascha Hehn as Peter Bachmeier

References

External links

1959 drama films
German drama films
West German films
Films directed by Werner Jacobs
UFA GmbH films
1950s German films